Chārbōlak (or Chahar Bolak or Char Bolak) district (pop: 66,300) is located in the western part of Balkh Province. Its capital is the village of Charbolak, 40 km northwest of Mazari Sharif. The majority of the population is Pashtun.

The previous name of this district was Adina Masjid (آدینه‌ مسجد), which was changed to Charbolak by Mohammad Gul Khan Momand.

Sources

Districts of Balkh Province